Paloalto is the debut album by alternative rock band Paloalto. It was produced by Rick Rubin and released by American Recordings in 2000. Scott Weiland of Stone Temple Pilots covered "Some Things Must Go This Way" for his 2008 album "Happy" in Galoshes.

Track listing
 "Depression Age"
 "Sonny"
 "Monolith"
 "Throw the Brick"
 "Home"
 "Some Things Must Go This Way"
 "The Mayor and the Seizure Pills"
 "Coming Back from the Sun"
 "Too Many Questions"
 "Swim"
 "Beauty of Disaster"	
 "Made of Stone"

References

2000 debut albums
Paloalto (band) albums
American Recordings (record label) albums
Albums produced by Rick Rubin